= Magiran =

Iranian digital library

Magiran.com
- Website type: Bank of scientific research articles; List of Iranian researchers
- Owner: Magiran
- Website: www.magiran.com
- Launched: 2000
- Current status: Active

Magiran (Persian: مگیران)—Iran's publications database—is a digital library that was founded in 2000 and includes digitized versions of scientific journals, which currently provides the possibility of searching among the full text of 1,500 journals. Registration is required for full access to the database, but access to some items such as newspapers is also possible without registration. A list of Iranian researchers is also maintained there.
